Fred Payawan (born March 12, 1989) is a Filipino actor. He is a co-housemate with PBB Teen Edition. He is one of Gerald Anderson's bestfriends, from whom he met in PBB Teen Edition. He is part of ABS-CBN Star Magic talents.

Filmography

Television

Movies

References

1989 births
Living people
Star Magic
Pinoy Big Brother contestants
People from Parañaque
Male actors from Metro Manila